"En qué estrella estará" is the second official single from the Spanish band Nena Daconte from their debut Album He perdido los zapatos. It topped the singles charts in Spain. 
This song is the official track from the Vuelta Ciclista a España 2006.

Charts

References

2006 songs
2006 singles
Nena Daconte songs
Songs written by Mai Meneses